Debora Agreiter (born 25 February 1991) is an Italian cross-country skier.  She competed at the 2014 Winter Olympics in Sochi, in skiathlon and women's classical.

Cross-country skiing results
All results are sourced from the International Ski Federation (FIS).

Olympic Games

World Championships

World Cup

Season standings

References

External links
 
 
 
 

1991 births
Living people
Cross-country skiers at the 2014 Winter Olympics
Italian female cross-country skiers
Tour de Ski skiers
Olympic cross-country skiers of Italy
Cross-country skiers of Centro Sportivo Carabinieri
Sportspeople from Brixen